Sansapor Airfield (also known as Mar Airfield) is a former World War II airfield located in the village of Werur, in Tambrauw Regency, Southwest Papua, Indonesia. The airfield was abandoned after the war and today is almost totally returned to its natural state.

History
The US Army landed unopposed in the area on 31 July 1944. The airfield was built soon after the landing as a forward operational facility.

USAAF units assigned to Sansapor 
 86th Fighter Wing		        (19 August 1944 – 16 January 1945)
 42d Bombardment Group, (16 September 1944 – 22 February 1945)
 Headquarters, 69th, 75th, 100th, 390th Bombardment Squadrons, B-25 Mitchell

 12th Fighter Squadron (18th Fighter Group), (23 August-13 January 1945), P-38 Lightning
 70th Fighter Squadron (18th Fighter Group), (23 August-19 January 1945), P-38 Lightning
 347th Fighter Group, (15 August-19 September 1944)
 Headquarters, 339th Fighter Squadron, P-38 Lightning

See also

 USAAF in the Southwest Pacific

References

 Maurer, Maurer (1983). Air Force Combat Units Of World War II. Maxwell AFB, Alabama: Office of Air Force History. .

External links
 Sansapor Airfield at Pacificwrecks.com

Airports in Southwest Papua 
Defunct airports in Indonesia
Airfields of the United States Army Air Forces in the South West Pacific theatre of World War II
World War II sites in Indonesia